Mensa Ansah, better known as M3NSA is a British Ghanaian producer, composer, rapper, singer and filmmaker. Known for his recognizable sound and instinctual storytelling, while still being deeply rooted in his motherland, he has grown into an international sensation through the years   because of his ability to navigate different languages, cultures, and art expressions.

Early life 
M3NSA was born in 1981 at Accra, Ghana. He is the third son of Tumi Ebo Ansah, formerly a member of the Afro pop group, Osibisa.

Musical career 
M3NSA begun as a member of The Lifeline Family. A group he founded and worked with as a rapper. After the group was disbanded, he ventured music production and begun producing music for Reggie Rockstone. He later begun producing music for various Ghanaian musicians, some of which include Samini, KK Fosu, Obour and Tic Tac.

As a music artiste, M3NSA has toured with musicians such as the Wu-Tang Clan, and The Roots. M3NSA's works have gained recognition from KORA Awards, MOBO Awards, and Ghana Music Awards.

Discography

Solo albums
2001 - Repablic
2004 - Daily Basses
2007 - Weather Report
2011 - No.1 Mango Street

FOKN Bois Albums
2010 - Coz Ov Moni OS - Movie Soundtrack
2011 - Coz Ov Moni - The Kweku Ananse Remix EP - EP
2011 - Coz Ov Moni - The DJ Juls Dw3t3i Remixes - EP
2011 - FOKN Dunaquest in Budapest - EP
2012 - FOKN Dunaquest in Budapest Remixes - EP
2012 - FOKN Wit Ewe - Album
2013 - Coz Ov Moni 2 (FOKN Revenge) OS - Movie Soundtrack
2016 - FOKN Ode to Ghana 
2019 - Afrobeats LOL

Personal life 
M3NSA is a nephew to Kwaw Ansah, a film director, and Kofi Ansah, a fashion designer. He is also a cousin to the actor, Joey Ansah.

References 

Ghanaian rappers
Living people
Ghanaian songwriters
Ghanaian record producers
1981 births